Tomamae Dam  is a gravity dam located in Hokkaido Prefecture in Japan. The dam is used for irrigation. The catchment area of the dam is 56.4 km2. The dam impounds about 83  ha of land when full and can store 7400 thousand cubic meters of water. The construction of the dam was started on 1991 and completed in 1999.

References

Dams in Hokkaido